Beloit is an unincorporated community in Lyon County, Iowa, United States.

Geography
Beloit is located on the banks of the Big Sioux River in northwestern Iowa just across the river from Canton, South Dakota. U.S. Route 18 is just one mile to the north in Canton.

History
Originally served by the Chicago, Milwaukee, St. Paul and Pacific Railroad from 1881 until 1980, Beloit is currently served by the D&I Railroad. Beloit was home to Augustana College in 1881, but was then moved into Canton in 1888.

Beloit's population was 52 in 1925.

Notes

Unincorporated communities in Iowa
Unincorporated communities in Lyon County, Iowa
Populated places established in 1886